Yawm Halima is the name given to a battle fought between the rival Ghassanid and Lakhmid Arabs in the 6th century.

Considered "[o]ne of the most famous battles of pre-Islamic Arabia", it was named after Halima, a Ghassanid princess who assisted the warriors of her tribe in the battle. The exact identity of the Ghassanid king who fought the battle is not certain, but he is commonly identified with al-Harith ibn Jabalah, a major Byzantine client ruler who waged frequent conflicts with the Lakhmids under their respective king al-Mundhir III ibn al-Nu'man. The Lakhmids in turn were clients of the Sassanid Persians, and the perennial tribal warfare between them and the Ghassanids was combined with the larger rivalry between Byzantium and Persia, with the Arabs fighting as auxiliaries for the two great empires.

Yawm Halima is now commonly identified with a battle fought in June 554 near Chalcis (modern Qinnasrin), where the Ghassanids confronted one of Mundhir's raids. The Lakhmids were defeated and their king Mundhir fell on the field, but Harith also lost his eldest son Jabalah.

References

Sources

554
550s in the Byzantine Empire
550s conflicts
Battles involving the Ghassanids
Battles involving the Lakhmids
Pre-Islamic Arabia